Eselsbach may refer to following rivers of Germany:

 Eselsbach (Else) of North Rhine-Westphalia, left tributary of the Else
 Eselsbach (Warmenau) of North Rhine-Westphalia, right tributary of the Warmenau
 Eselsbach (Ette) of Baden-Württemberg, headstream of the Ette
 Eselsbach (Großbach) of Rhineland-Palatinate, tributary of the Großbach